Punisher, retitled Franken-Castle from issue #17 on, is a Marvel Comics comic book series featuring the character Frank Castle, also known as the Punisher. Spinning out of the second Punisher War Journal series by writer Matt Fraction, this series of Punisher places the character firmly in the ongoing Marvel Universe inhabited by superheroes such as the Avengers and Spider-Man, and super-villains such as Doctor Doom and the Masters of Evil. For the majority of issues released, the series had tied into the ongoing events of Marvel's line-wide "Dark Reign" storyline, opening with Castle attempting to assassinate Norman Osborn.

After the events of "Dark Reign", Castle was dismembered and killed by Wolverine's son, Daken, and reassembled as a Frankenstein monster by Morbius and the Legion of Monsters.

Publication history
The story continued in Punisher: In the Blood.

Story arcs

"Living in Darkness" (#1–5)
After Norman Osborn positions himself as "humanity's savior" following the "Secret Invasion", he becomes the foremost national security officer in the country and disbands S.H.I.E.L.D., placing a new organization, H.A.M.M.E.R., in its place. Holding Osborn accountable for his actions as the supervillain Green Goblin, the Punisher plans to assassinate Osborn. Joining forces with a new, tech-savvy young partner, Castle sets about taking Osborn down. Castle, normally favoring simple ends to his targets, must adapt his methods to Osborn's far-reaching influence and deep-seated corruption. Castle and his new associate Henry Russo elect to gather evidence of the former Green Goblin's wrongdoing in order to completely destroy his newfound reputation and end his Dark Reign once and for all. Osborn, on the other hand, has an associate waiting in the wings to get rid of the Punisher.

"Dead End" (#6–10, Annual #1)
The Hood's crime organization grows at an alarming rate, eluding the authorities of New York City, most of the superhero population, and Norman Osborn and H.A.M.M.E.R. The Punisher positions himself as the only thing resembling consequence and makes it a personal mission to bring Hood and his organization down. Although, Hood is ready for him in the form of the "Deadly Dozen," a highly trained team ready to move in on Castle and eliminate him. And in the monthly's first Annual, Punisher moves in on criminals of New York City before being confronted by a dangerously strong and agile hypnotized foe: Spider-Man.

Dark Reign: The List – Punisher #1

Going down his list of enemies to eliminate before ascending to, what he deems, "control of the world," Norman Osborn arrives at the man who made his list after attempting to assassinate him: Frank Castle. Devoting the entirety of H.A.M.M.E.R.'s resources to the elimination of the Punisher, Osborn is surprised at the vigilante's resourcefulness in evading H.A.M.M.E.R. ground forces. To remedy this, he dispatches Daken, the Avengers' dark reflection of Wolverine, to eliminate Castle once and for all. Finding him in a New York City sewer, a fight to the death ensues between the Dark Wolverine and the Punisher. The Punisher does well, and manages to fight on par with Daken, but the mutant's healing factor proved too much for Castle, and Daken eventually cut both his arms off before decapitating him.

"Dead and Alive" (#11–16)
Morbius and the Legion of Monsters reconstruct Frank as a Frankenstein monster. Morbius "re-composed" Castle, hoping his military experience, tactical mindset and leadership would help the Legion of Monsters overcome a society that has been hunting them down. However, Frank rejected the group upon waking up and left their base. He stayed in the tunnels, unaware the Legion was being slaughtered by the Japanese society. A creature who previously offered Frank food fled to him for help, but died at his doorstep. Frank joins in the fight to protect the innocent 'monstrous' entities being targeted by their enemies.

"Missing Pieces" (#17–21)
The series was retitled Franken-Castle starting here.

After being revived, Frank must find a way to live with his new limitations and make peace with what he has become. To do this, he hits the streets once again to punish the guilty, and begins to formulate a plan of vengeance against the man who killed him.

Daken, later seen at a nightclub, is attacked by the now monstrous Punisher, who is seeking revenge. After a brutal fight Daken is defeated but decides to hunt Franken-Castle to continue the fight and retrieve the Bloodstone integrated into Fraken-Castle's new physical form. After following Franken-Castle's trail, Daken encounters a series of devastating traps before meeting his foe again. After a second brutal hand-to-hand battle, Daken is severely injured and retreats. Franken-Castle finds him and, after damaging Daken even more, is about to throw him into a mass of concrete foundation (presumably to kill him). However, Franken-Castle is stabbed in the chest from behind, by Wolverine, who states he is intervening in his plans to kill his son.

Franken-Castle knocks Wolverine unconscious; however, Daken manages to slip away. Franken-Castle tries to avoid him, but Daken crashes into the vehicle and moves Franken-Castle's gem into his chest becoming invulnerable and attacks again. Wolverine and Franken-Castle are forced to work together to combat Daken because the effects of the Bloodgem on Daken's healing factor are disastrous. During their battle on the rooftop, Franken-Castle finally takes down the insane Daken. After Daken was defeated, Wolverine removes the gems from his son and gives it to Franken-Castle and the scene ends with Wolverine alone on a rooftop.

After his fight with Daken, Punisher returns to Monster Island and the Bloodstone seems to have returned him to normal but he starts growing insane and the monster within the Bloodgem is starting to take control of him. The Legion of Monsters decide to take him down and retrieve the Bloodstone from him with the help of Elsa Bloodstone. Though Manphibian attempts to talk some sense into the Punisher, Elsa decides to just shoot him and take the stone from him. This angers Punisher and he fights and defeats Elsa in a jungle but before he could finish her off Werewolf by Night intervened and saved Elsa. Then the Living Mummy convinces Frank to give up the gem and walk away.

Prints

Issues
The first 16 issues were simply titled Punisher.

As of issue 17 the series was officially retitled Franken-Castle.

Annuals

One-shots

Collected editions

Reception
The first 16 issues holds an average rating of 7.8 by 51 professional critics on the review aggregation website Comic Book Roundup. After the series was renamed it holds an average rating of 6.5 by 18 professional critics.

References

External links
 Punisher (2009) at the Comic Book DB
 Franken-Castle at the Comic Book DB

2009 series
Comics by Rick Remender
Comics set in New York City
Defunct American comics